Jaszi (originally Jászi) is a Hungarian surname.

List of people with the surname

Andrew Jaszi (1917–1998), son of Anna and Oszkár, was an American philosopher and literary scholar.
Anna Jászi, known as Anna Lesznai (1885–1966), was a Hungarian writer.
Oszkár Jászi (1875–1957) was a Hungarian social scientist, historian, and politician.
Peter Jaszi, grandson of Oszkár, is an American expert on copyright law.

Surnames